Ole Amundsen Buslett (May 28, 1855 – June 5, 1924) was a Norwegian-born American author, newspaperman, and politician.

Background
Ole Amundsen Buslett was born in Gausdal, Oppland, Norway. Buslett was the oldest of eight children born to Amund Halvorsen Buslett and Netta (Kalstad) Ringsrud. He migrated to the United States with his family in 1868 and settled in the town of Iola, in Waupaca County, Wisconsin.

Career
In 1888, Buslett opened a country store and post office in Northland, Wisconsin. He served as postmaster, justice of the peace, and town clerk. In 1893, he became editor and part owner of Varden then later  served as editor of Folkevennen. Both publications were Norwegian-language newspapers published in La Crosse, Wisconsin. In August 1894, he became editor of Normannen in Stoughton, Wisconsin. In March 1896, the publication was sold to Chicago-based Amerika. He held political offices in Waupaca County and was a member of the Wisconsin State Assembly from 1909 until 1910.
 
Buslett wrote in Norwegian. His writings included novels, stories, poems, and plays. His works primarily portrayed the lives of Norwegian immigrants in Wisconsin. He also wrote a history of the 15th Wisconsin Volunteer Regiment. Det Femtende Regiment Wisconsin Frivillige was published in 1894. It was translated into English and published as The Fifteenth Wisconsin in 1999.

He died at his home in Northland on June 5, 1924.

Selected works
Fram (1882)
Leilighets digte (1882)
Skaars skjæbne (1882)
Øistein og Nora (1884)
De to veivisere, et dramatisk digt i seks handlinger (1885)
Snip-Snap-Snude (1889)
Et dødens døgn, sørgespill (1890)
Rolf Hagen ( 1893)
Torstein i nybygden (1897)
Sagastolen, fortælling fra det norske Amerika (1908)
I Parnassets lunde (1911)
Amerika-Paul  (1913)
Veien til Golden Gate (1915)
Benediktus og Jacobus (1920)

References

Primary sources
Øverland, Orm The Western Home : A Literary History of Norwegian America  (Chapter 10, Ole Amundsen Buslett, Romantic Idealist. Norwegian American Historic Association. 1996)
Hustvedt, Lloyd Ole Amundsen Buslett, 1855-1924 (from "Makers of an American Immigrant Legacy: Essays in Honor of Kenneth O. Bjork",  Odd S. Lovoll, editor, Norwegian-American Historical Association, 2001)

External links
Portrait of Ole Amundsen Buslett
The Road to the Golden Gate by Hustvedt, Lloyd
Veien til Golden Gate Jul i Vesterheimen (Minneapolis, 1913)  

1855 births
1924 deaths
People from Gausdal
Norwegian emigrants to the United States
Wisconsin state court judges
Republican Party members of the Wisconsin State Assembly
Novelists from Wisconsin
19th-century American novelists
People from Iola, Wisconsin
20th-century American novelists
American male novelists
19th-century American male writers
20th-century American male writers